Lee Roy James (October 31, 1953 – February 11, 2023) was an American Olympic weightlifter.

On February 18, 2023, it was announced that James had died at the age of 69.

Weightlifting achievements
Silver Medalist  Olympic Games (1976)
Silver Medalist Senior World Championships (1976)
Senior American record holder in snatch (1972-1992)
Senior National Champion (1976 and 1978)

References

1953 births
2023 deaths
Sportspeople from Gulfport, Mississippi
Olympic silver medalists for the United States in weightlifting
Weightlifters at the 1976 Summer Olympics
American male weightlifters
Pan American Games medalists in weightlifting
Pan American Games gold medalists for the United States
Weightlifters at the 1975 Pan American Games
Medalists at the 1976 Summer Olympics
Medalists at the 1975 Pan American Games
20th-century American people